Ralph William Nattrass (May 26, 1925 – April 30, 2014) was a Canadian professional ice hockey player who played 223 games in the National Hockey League (NHL) with the Chicago Black Hawks between 1946 and 1950. In 2014, Nattress died at the Grey Nuns Community Hospital in Edmonton, Alberta.

Career statistics

Regular season and playoffs

References

External links 
 

1925 births
2014 deaths
Canadian ice hockey defencemen
Chicago Blackhawks players
Cincinnati Mohawks (AHL) players
Ice hockey people from Saskatchewan
Kansas City Pla-Mors players
Moose Jaw Canucks players